Metacypris is a genus of ostracods belonging to the family Limnocytheridae.

Species:
 Metacypris cordata

References

Podocopida
Podocopida genera